The Anou Ifflis cave is a cave located in Tizi Ouzou in the mountains of the Kabylie .

Notes and references 

Caves of Algeria
Geography of Tizi Ouzou Province